This is a list of New Jersey suffragists, suffrage groups and others associated with the cause of women's suffrage in New Jersey.

Groups 

 New Jersey chapter of the Congressional Union for Woman Suffrage is formed in 1915.
Equal Franchise Society of New Jersey, organized in 1910.
Equal Justice League, formed in Bayonne in 1911.
Equal Suffrage League of the Amboys.
Essex County Suffrage Society.
Hudson County Woman Suffrage Party.
Montclair Equal Suffrage League.
National Woman's Party (NWP) of New Jersey.
New Brunswick Equal Suffrage League.
New Jersey Men's League for Equal Suffrage, formed in 1910.
New Jersey Woman Suffrage Association (NJWSA), formed in 1867.
Orange Political Study Club (OPSC), created in 1898.
Progressive Woman Suffrage Society.
Rutherford Equal Suffrage League.
Sewaren Equal Suffrage League.
Vineland Equal Suffrage Association, formed in 1866.
Woman's Christian Temperance Union.
Woman's Political Union of New Jersey.

Suffragists 

 Minnie Abbott (Atlantic City).
Minnie Adams (Sewaren).
Caroline B. Alexander (Hoboken).
Antoinette Brown Blackwell (Elizabeth).
Emma L. Blackwell.
Henry Browne Blackwell (Orange).
Cornelia Foster Bradford.
Augusta Cooper Bristol (Vineland).
Charlotte Emerson Brown.
Katharine H. Browning (West Orange).
Harriet Carpenter (Newark).
Flora Gapen Charters.
Edith H. Colby (West Orange).
Mary Kendall Loring Colvin (East Orange).
Agnes M. Cromwell (Mendham).
Seymour L. Cromwell.
May Chase Cummings (Middlesex County).
Fanny B. Downs (Orange).
Sarah Corson Downs.
Mary Dubrow (Passaic).
Thomas Edison (West Orange).
Charlotte N. Enslin (Orange).
Bertha L. Fearey (East Orange).
Lillian Feickert.
Florence F. Foster.
Susan Pecker Fowler (Vineland).
Cecilia Gaines (Jersey City).
Emma O. Gantz (East Orange).
Angelina Grimké.
 Sarah Moore Grimké.
Florence Howe Hall.
Phebe Hanaford (Jersey City).
Alma Arabella Parker Harvey (Deal).
Carrie H. Henry (Jersey City).
Alison Turnbull Hopkins (Morristown).
Julia Hurlbut (Morristown).
Cornelia C. Hussey (East Orange).
Mary D. Hussey (East Orange).
Anna B. Jeffery.
Elizabeth A. Kingsbury (Vineland).
Beatrice Kinkead (Montclair).
Martha Klatscken (East Orange).
Clara Schlee Laddey.
Harriet Lafetra (Monmouth).
Alice Lakey (Cranford).
Amelia Berndt Moorfield (Newark).
Mary Pattison (Colonia).
Alice Paul (Mt. Laurel).
Mary Philbrook (Newark).
Aaron Macy Powell.
Anita Stillman Quarles (Hoboken).
Florence Spearing Randolph.
Ella M. Rice (Middlesex County).
Linton Satterthwaite (Trenton).
Melinda Scott (Newark).
Phoebe Scott (Morristown).
Agnes Anne Schermerhorn (East Orange).
Therese Walling Seabrook (Keyport).
Sarah E. Selover (South River).
Minola Graham Sexton (Orange).
 Elizabeth Cady Stanton (Tenafly).
Lucy Stone (Orange).
Rhea Vickers.
Mina Van Winkle.

Politicians supporting women's suffrage 

 William Miller Baird.
Robert Carey (Jersey City).
Thomas Chattle.
Everett Colby.
Walter Evans Edge.
Charles M. Egan (Jersey City).
John Franklin Fort.
William C. Gebhardt (Hunterdon County).
Charles O'Connor Hennessy (Bergen County).
Henry Lafetra (Monmouth).
Victor Mavalag (Elizabeth).
Walter I. McCoy.
William Lawrence Saunders (Plainfield).
Judge John Whitehead.
Alexander Wilder (Newark).

Suffragists campaigning in New Jersey 

 Alice Stone Blackwell.
Lillie Devereux Blake.
Lucretia Longshore Blankenburg.
Harriot Stanton Blatch.
Carrie Chapman Catt.
Mariana Wright Chapman.
Liska Stillman Churchill.
 Annie Le Porte Diggs.
Rheta Childe Dorr.
Charlotte Perkins Gilman.
Kate M. Gordon.
Mary Garrett Hay.
 Clara Cleghorn Hoffman.
 Julia Ward Howe.
Fola La Follette.
 Mary Livermore.
Sophia Loebinger.
Ellis Meredith.
George Middleton.
Florence Miller.
Emmeline Pankhurst.
Emily Pierson.
Minnie Reynolds.
Helen Ring Robinson.
Anna Howard Shaw.
Mary Church Terrell.
Mabel Vernon.
Fanny Garrison Villard.
 Elizabeth Upham Yates.

Anti-suffragists 
Groups

 Men's Anti-Suffrage League of New Jersey.
New Jersey Association Opposed to Woman Suffrage (NJAOWS) is formed in 1912.

People
 Anna Dayton (Trenton).
Georgiana Breese.
Frances Cleveland (Princeton).
Harriet Clark Fisher (Trenton).
Mrs. O. D. Oliphant (Trenton).
John A. Matthews (Newark).
William Francis Magie (Princeton).
Blanche O. Roebling (Trenton).
Anti-suffragists campaigning in New Jersey

 Minnie Bronson.
Josephine Jewell Dodge.
Alice N. George.

See also 

 Timeline of women's suffrage in New Jersey
 Women's suffrage in New Jersey
 Women's suffrage in states of the United States
 Women's suffrage in the United States

References

Sources 

 

New Jersey suffrage

New Jersey suffragists
Activists from New Jersey
History of New Jersey
Suffragists